The 2018 III liiga is the 21st season of the III liiga, fifth-highest league for association football clubs in Estonia.

III Liiga North

2018 season

The following clubs are competing in II liiga North/East during the 2018 season.

Tallinna JK Dünamo
Tallinna FC Hell Hunt
JK Retro
Tallinna FC Eston Villa
Rumori Calcio Tallinn
Harju JK Laagri
Saku Sporting
Nõmme Kalju FC III
FC Zenit Tallinn
Tallinna FC TransferWise
Tallinna FC Zapoos
Tallinna KSK FC Štrommi

Results
League table

Results table

Statistics

Top scorers

Most viewed matches

Least viewed matches

III Liiga South

2018 season

The following clubs are competing in III liiga South during the 2018 season.

SK Imavere
FC Tarvastu          
FC Vastseliina
Viljandi JK Tulevik III
Põhja-Sakala          
FC Jõgeva Wolves    
EMÜ SK        
Valga FC Warrior  
Võru FC Helios II
Tartu FC Helios           
FC Elva II            
Põlva FC Lootos

Results
League table

Results table

Statistics

Top scorers

Most viewed matches

Least viewed matches

III Liiga East

2018 season

The following clubs are competing in III liiga East during the 2018 season.

Viimsi JK II 
FCI Tallinn II   
FC Sillamäe       
FC Järva-Jaani          
Koeru JK                                               
Ambla Vallameeskond    
JK Loo        
Anija JK              
Tallinna JK Augur
Lasnamäe FC Ajax II      
Kadrina SK            
Rakvere JK Tarvas II

Results
League table

Results table

Statistics

Top scorers

Most viewed matches

Least viewed matches

III Liiga West

2018 season

The following clubs are competing in III liiga West during the 2018 season.

Saue JK 
Põhja-Tallinna JK Volta II
Lihula JK
FC Hiiumaa  
Rummu Dünamo
FC Kose
JK Kernu Kadakas
Haapsalu JK
Kohila Püsivus
Pärnu JK Poseidon II
Keila JK II
Vändra JK Vaprus II

Results
League table

Results table

Statistics

Top scorers

Most viewed matches

Least viewed matches

Post-Season
League winner

Promotion Play-offs

Relegation Play-offs

References

Football leagues in Estonia
4
Estonia
Estonia